Under the Surface is the debut album from Norwegian singer-songwriter and M2M member Marit Larsen which was released on March 6, 2006. All but three of the songs on the album were written solely by Marit herself. The album went gold in Norway after selling more than 20,000 copies in less than 3 weeks. The album debuted and peaked at No. 3 on the sales chart in Norway. The album spent 52 weeks on VG Topp 40 and 62 weeks on VG Topp 30 Norsk and so far.

Track listing

Technical credits
Stian Andersen – Photography
Erland Dahlen – Percussion, Drums
Silje Haugan – Violin
Lars Horntveth – Conductor, String Arrangements
Martin Horntveth – Percussion, Drums, Clapping
Vegard Johnsen – Violin
Frode Larsen – Violin
Marit Larsen – Producer, Guitar (Acoustic), Guitar, Harmonica, Mandolin, Percussion, Piano, arranger, Glockenspiel, Guitar (Electric), Vocals, Clapping, Cover Design, Tambor, Guitar (Nylon String)
Odd Nordstoga – Guitar (Acoustic), Accordion
Kåre Vestrheim – Producer

Chart

Certifications

References

2006 debut albums
Marit Larsen albums